Eoin Fitzgerald (born 7 January 1980) is an Irish former hurler. He played with a number of clubs, including Castlelyons, Castlegar and Oranmore-Maree, divisional side Imokilly and was also a member of the Cork senior hurling team. He usually lined out as a forward.

Career

Fitzgerald played schoolboy hurling with St Colman's College in Fermoy on a team that won consecutive Harty Cup titles and an All-Ireland Colleges Championship title in 1997. He later lined out with the University of Limerick and won a Fitzgibbon Cup title in 2002. At club level, Fitzgerald first lined out with Castlelyons in the juvenile and underage grades and was just 17-years-old when he won a Cork JAHC title with the team in 1997. This was followed by a Cork IHC title and a Cork SHC title with divisional side Imokilly in 1998. Fitzgerald first appeared on the inter-county scene as a member of the Cork minor hurling team that beat Kilkenny in the All-Ireland minor hurling final. He progressed through the under-21 and intermediate teams before winning a Munster Championship title with the senior team in 2000. A broken collarbone ruled him out of the 2003 championship, however, he returned to the panel for the 2004 league.

Honours

St. Colman's College
Dr. Croke Cup: 1997
Dr. Harty Cup: 1996, 1997

University of Limerick
Fitzgibbon Cup: 2002

Castlelyons
Cork Intermediate Hurling Championship: 1998
Cork Junior A Hurling Championship: 1997

Imokilly
Cork Senior Hurling Championship: 1998

Cork
Munster Senior Hurling Championship: 2000
Munster Intermediate Hurling Championship: 1999
All-Ireland Minor Hurling Championship: 1998
Munster Minor Hurling Championship: 1998

References

External link

 Eoin Fitzgerald profile at the Hogan Stand website

1980 births
Living people
Castlelyons hurlers
Castlegar hurlers
Oranmore-Maree hurlers
Imokilly hurlers
Cork inter-county hurlers
Gaelic games players from County Cork